Laurida is an order of crustacean in the infraclass Ascothoracida. It consists of the following families and genera:
 Lauridae 
 Baccalaureus 
 Laura 
 Polymarsypus 
 Zoanthoecus 
 Petrarcidae 
 Introcornia 
 Petrarca 
 Zibrowia 
 Synagogidae 
 Cardomanica 
 Flatsia 
 Gorgonolaureus 
 Isidascus 
 Sesillogoga 
 Synagoga 
 Thalassomembracis 
 Waginella

References

Laurida
Crustacean orders